Fray Antonio de Ciudad Rodrigo (also Antonio Civitatencis) was a Franciscan friar. He was one of the first twelve to come to New Spain in 1524, and the second provincial of the province of the Holy Gospel.

Year of birth missing
Year of death missing
16th-century Spanish people
Spanish Franciscans